The Progressive Arab Front was a political coalition in Lebanon, founded by Kamal Jumblatt in October 1961. The coalition was founded in response to the break-up of the United Arab Republic. It opposed the Syrian separatism and called for support to Gamal Abdel Nasser. The Progressive Arab Front consisted of the Progressive Socialist Party and the Arab Nationalist Movement. It largely corresponded to the parliamentary National Struggle Front, but through the Progressive Arab Front the parliamentarian Issam al-Hajjar joined the six PSP members in the Chamber of Deputies. The program of the Progressive Arab Front was based on Arab nationalism and socialism.

References

1961 establishments in Lebanon
Arab nationalism in Lebanon
Arab Nationalist Movement
Defunct nationalist parties
Defunct political party alliances in Lebanon
Defunct socialist parties in Asia
Nasserist political parties
Nationalist parties in Lebanon
Political parties established in 1961
Political parties with year of disestablishment missing
Socialist parties in Lebanon